Malabo Kings FC is an Equatorial Guinean women's football club based in Malabo, the country capital city. It consists of a professional senior team that currently plays in the Equatoguinean Primera División femenina, the women's top tier of Equatorial Guinea's football. It is affiliated to Malabo Kings BC, a men's basketball team, and Futuro Kings, a Mongomo-based men's football team that plays in the Liga Nacional de Fútbol.

Malabo Kings has won the Primera División in 2018–19. In 2021, it was selected as the representative for Equatorial Guinea at the UNIFFAC qualifiers which won after beating DR Congo club FCF Amani by a lone goal in the finals and qualified them to the inaugural 2021 CAF Women's Champions League.

Current squad
As of 27 January 2022.

Honours

Domestic 
League titles

 Equatoguinean Primera División femenina

 Winners (1): 2018–19

 Coupe de la première dame

 Winners (1): 2019

 Coupe TNO

 Winners (1): 2021

Continental 
 UNIFFAC-CAF Women's Champions League Qualifiers

 Winners  (1): 2021

See also 
 Futuro Kings
 Equatoguinean Primera División femenina

References

External links

Football clubs in Equatorial Guinea
Futuro Kings FC
Women's football clubs in Equatorial Guinea